Alice Deejay are a Dutch Eurodance-pop project founded and produced by Wessel van Diepen, Dennis van den Driesschen, Sebastiaan Molijn and Eelke Kalberg (Pronti & Kalmani), fronted by singer Judith Anna Pronk. They are best known for their 1999 single "Better Off Alone", which was a worldwide success, selling over one million albums and 5 million singles worldwide.

History
Formed in 1998, Alice Deejay launched their career in July 1999 with their debut single, "Better Off Alone",  credited as DJ Jurgen presents Alice Deejay. The song reached the top 10 in many European countries and also charted in North America. In the UK, the song went platinum and reached number 2 on the UK Singles Chart, and number 3 on the US Billboard Hot Dance Music/Club Play, also reaching number 27 on the US Billboard Hot 100. Their second single, "Back in My Life", was released in November 1999 and reached number-one in Norway, and the top 10 in Denmark, Finland, Ireland, the Netherlands, Sweden, and the United Kingdom.

The project's only album was Who Needs Guitars Anyway?, and was released in March 2000. It entered the top ten of the UK Albums Chart. They released three more singles from the album, "Will I Ever", "The Lonely One" and "Celebrate Our Love", and all reached the top 20 in the United Kingdom. Pronk, together with backing-singers, toured dance-themed venues to perform live. In 2002, this line-up made their final appearance together.

First revival 
After more than a decade of inactivity, in 2014 the producers who originally launched Alice Deejay revived the group, with new vocalist Ilona, a Dutch singer and DJ. The new lineup changed its name slightly to "Alice DJ" and began touring.

Reunion tour 
20 years after her last performance as Alice Deejay, in October 2021 the group announced that Pronk would be returning to the group, with several tour dates announced across Europe for the remainder of the year.

On 16 October 2021, Pronk returned as Alice Deejay again live on stage after 20 years at the Ethias Arena in Belgium. She also appeared in the 3 arena in Dublin on 23 October 2021.

Production
The project was founded and produced by Danski (Dennis van den Driesschen) Delmundo (Wessel van Diepen) and their protégés Pronti (Sebastiaan Molijn) and Kalmani (Eelke Kalberg).

Discography

Studio albums

Singles

References

External links
[ Alice Deejay AllMusic page]
About Dance Music interview with Pronti and Kalmani
Alice Deejay Discogs page
Judith Pronk website
Alice DJ website

Armada Music artists
Dutch dance music groups
Dutch Eurodance groups
Dutch trance music groups
Dutch electronic music groups
Musical groups established in 1999
Musical groups disestablished in 2002
Musical groups reestablished in 2014
1999 establishments in the Netherlands
Positiva Records artists